Shaharah District  is a district of the 'Amran Governorate, Yemen. As of 2003, the district had a population of 43,738 inhabitants. Its capital lies at Shaharah.

References

Districts of 'Amran Governorate
Shaharah District